The 21st edition of the Men's Asian Amateur Boxing Championships were held from June 18 to June 25, 2002 in Paroi Centre Court Sports Complex, Seremban, Malaysia. Uzbekistan dominated the competition, winning five gold medals.

Medal summary

Medal table

References
Results

External links
amateur-boxing

2002
Asian Boxing
Boxing
Boxing
International sports competitions hosted by Malaysia
Boxing in Malaysia
Seremban